The American Presidency with Bill Clinton is a 2022 historical documentary series by History hosted by Bill Clinton. It premiered on May 30, 2022, for six episodes concluding on June 6, 2022. The series explores the topics of race, extremism, economic issues, the struggle for rights, presidential vision, and global power. The series is also executive produced by Clinton. All episodes included commentary from Jon Meacham, Annette Gordon-Reed, Douglas Brinkley, Edna Medford Green, H. W. Brands, and George Takei. In May 2020, Clinton signed a deal with History to produce and host the show.

Episodes

References

External links

2022 American television series debuts
2022 American television series endings
2020s American documentary television series
History (American TV channel) original programming
American documentary television series about politics
Documentary television series about politics
English-language television shows
Television series about presidents of the United States
Bill Clinton